Bhagwat (also spelled as Bhagvat), is a surname found among Hindu Brahmin communities in India. It is found mainly among Deshastha Brahmins, Chitpavan Brahmins and Karhade Brahmins.

Etymology
The term Bhagwat or Bhagvat or Bhagavate means a follower of Bhagavata Sampradaya of Madhvacharya. They are devotees of Bhagavān Krishna.

Notable people
Anjali Bhagwat (born 1969), rifle shooter from India
Anupama Bhagwat (born 1974), Indian sitar player
Durga Bhagwat (1910–2002), Indian scholar, socialist and writer
Mohan Bhagwat (born 1950), veterinary doctor and the current Sarsanghachalak of Rashtriya Swayamsevak Sangh.
Sitaram Bhaskar Bhagwat (1904–1999), freedom fighter, Indian political and social leader in Uttar Pradesh, India.
Vishnu Bhagwat, former Chief of the Naval Staff of India
Neela Bhagwat, Hindustani classical vocalist, Gwalior gharana.

See also
Latey family

References

Indian surnames